Garrane is a townland in County Westmeath, Ireland. The townland  is in the civil parish of Castlelost. The M6 Motorway runs through the south of the area, and the R446 regional road cuts through the middle of the townland. The town of Rochfortbridge is to the east, with Tyrrellspass to the west.

References 

Townlands of County Westmeath